Acacia cyclocarpa, commonly known as ring-pod minni-ritchie, is a shrub belonging to the genus Acacia and the subgenus Juliflorae. It is native to a small area of the Kimberley region of Western Australia.

Description
Like most species of Acacia it has phyllodes rather than true leaves. The evergreen, thin-textured and flat phyllodes have a narrowly linear to linear-elliptic shape that is narrowed at the base.

Distribution
It is endemic to the north western parts of Western Australia in the Kimberley region where it is found in the Prince Regent River catchment area with reasonably large populations with the individuals growing in skeletal sandy soils over broken sandstone scattered over several kilometres. It is part of scrubland communities that also include Acacia orthocarpa, Eucalyptus miniata, Eucalyptus phoenicea, Owenia vernicosa and Triodia claytonii.

See also
 List of Acacia species

References

cyclocarpa
Acacias of Western Australia
Plants described in 2013
Taxa named by Russell Lindsay Barrett
Taxa named by Bruce Maslin
Taxa named by Matthew David Barrett